Polynoncus hemisphaericus is a species of hide beetle in the subfamily Omorginae found in Argentina and Chile.

References

hemisphaericus
Beetles described in 1876